Trachelas volutus is a species of true spider in the family Trachelidae. It is found in the United States and Mexico.

References

Trachelidae
Articles created by Qbugbot
Spiders described in 1935